Valtriano is a village in Tuscany, central Italy,  administratively a frazione of the comune of Fauglia, province of Pisa. At the time of the 2001 census its population was 334.

Valtriano is about 25 km from Pisa and 6 km from Fauglia.

References 

Frazioni of the Province of Pisa